Last Drive is the first and only studio album by Eric Burdon's Fire Dept., released in 1980.

History
Every song title from the album is also listed on the front cover. Also some lyrics are visible on it, "Outlaw motorcycle gangs have joined forces with the citizen drivers, look out for hot Chevey panel truck" (from "The Last Drive") and "Take my spirit someplace else" (from "The Last Poet").

The front cover was drawn by Eric Burdon. The band's logo, visible on the back cover, was drawn by Gerd Grzelak. The album was recorded at the "Tonstudio", Hiltpoltstein, West Germany (April 1980) and at "La Playa", Frejus, France (June 1980). The inner sleeve photographs were taken by Jürgen V. Gzarnowski.

Track listing
All lyrics composed by Eric V. Burdon; except where indicated
All music composed by Fire Dept. (Bernd Gärtig, Bertram Passmann, Frank Diez, Jackie Carter, Jean-Jacques Kravetz, Nippy Noya and Reginald Worthy)
 "The Last Drive" (4:10)
 "Power Company" (4:16)
 "Bird on the Beach" (7:02)
 "The Rubbing out of Long Hair" (2:46)
 "Atom-Most-Fear" (4:17)
 "Dry" (4:43)
 "Female Terrorist" (6:47)
 "The Last Poet" (Brendan Behan, Dominic Behan) (2:47)

Personnel

Fire Department
 Eric Burdon - lead vocals
 Jackie Carter - vocals
 Frank Diez - guitar
 Bernd Gärtig - guitar, vocals
 Jean-Jacques Kravetz - keyboards
 Reginald Worthy - bass guitar
 Bertram Engel - drums, vocals, synthesizer, steel drums
 Nippy Noya - Afro percussion

1980 albums
Eric Burdon albums
Ariola Records albums